Landing Creek may refer to:

Landing Creek (New Jersey), a stream
Landing Creek (South Dakota), a stream